Understand This Is a Dream is the debut studio album by Greensburg, Pennsylvania rock band, The Juliana Theory, released on March 23, 1999 by Tooth & Nail Records. Prior to the release of Love in 2003, Understand This Is a Dream had reportedly sold over 150,000 copies.

Production
Understand This Is a Dream was recorded between October 16 and 30, 1998 at Poynter Recordings Facility in Little Rock, Arkansas, with producer and engineer Barry Poynter, assisted by Jason Magnusson. The band stayed at the Economy Inn, and were driven to the studio by Momper's parents Pop and Michelle. Detar's and Momper's parents provided additional funding for the sessions; the band loaned equipment from Phyrric Victory. Poynter, Magnusson and Detar mixed the recordings, before they were mastered by Ramone at Oceanview Digital Mastering.

Critical reception 

Doug Van Pelt from HM Magazine stated that "If you like the infectious pop of Plankeye, and appreciate that it's dirty and groove-filled rather than compressed and polished (the "Nashville treatment"), [you] will love The Juliana Theory."

Track listing 
All music by the Juliana Theory, all lyrics by Brett Detar, except for assistance from Chad Alan on "Duane Joseph" and "Seven Forty Seven".

 "This Is Not a Love Song" - 3:13
 "Duane Joseph" - 4:01
 "August in Bethany" - 4:21
 "Music Box Superhero" - 4:27
 "Seven Forty Seven" - 3:03
 "The Closest Thing" - 4:09
 "Show Me the Money" - 4:28
 "For Evangeline" - 5:03
 "P.S. We'll Call You When We Get There" - 3:07
 "Constellation" - 6:34
 "Farewell My Friend" - 2:44 (Vinyl Only Track)

Personnel
Personnel per booklet.

The Juliana Theory
 Brett Detar – vocals
 Chad Allan – bass
 Jeremiah Momper – guitar
 Joshua Fielder – guitar
 Neil Herbank – drums

Additional musicians
 Barry Poynter – slide guitar (track 8)

Production and design
 Barry Poynter – engineer, producer, mixing
 Jason Magnusson – assistant, mixing
 Brett Detar – mixing
 Ramone – mastering
 Roman Barrett – photography
 Jason Parker – art direction
 The Juliana Theory – art direction
 Brandon Ebel – executive producer

References

1999 debut albums
The Juliana Theory albums
Tooth & Nail Records albums